Martin Dixon (born 30 May 1961) is a former speedway rider from England.

Speedway career 
Dixon reached the final of the British Speedway Championship in 1995. He rode in the top tier of British Speedway from 1977 to 2002, riding for various clubs.

References 

Living people
1961 births
British speedway riders
Berwick Bandits riders
Birmingham Brummies riders
Glasgow Tigers riders
Halifax Dukes riders
King's Lynn Stars riders
Long Eaton Invaders riders
Middlesbrough Bears riders
Newcastle Diamonds riders
Stoke Potters riders
Swindon Robins riders